John M. Janzen is a Professor Emeritus in the Department of Anthropology at the University of Kansas. He has been a leading figure on issues of health, illness, and healing in Southern and Central Africa since the 1960s and has dedicated much of his career to providing a better understanding of African society. Janzen’s knowledge of the Kikongo language and his intermittent visits to the lower Congo region between 1964 and 2013 have paved the way for a contextual understanding of the roots of Western Equatorial African approaches to sickness and healing, combining African and Western derived biomedical therapies. Janzen’s research has expanded to include other African countries such as Rwanda, Burundi, Senegal, South Africa, Swaziland, Tanzania, and Sudan. He is the former director of the Kansas African Studies Center at the University of Kansas. .

Biography 

John M. Janzen was born to Hilda Gertrude Neufeldt and Louis Abraham Janzen on October 28, 1937 in Newton, Kansas. He is the second of four children, and one of three boys in his family. He is married to Reinhild Kauenhoven and has three children.

Upon high school graduation from Berean Academy, he attended Bethel College for four years. Here he met his future wife, Reinhild Kauenhoven, a then student-colleague from Göttingen, Germany. After his second year in school, Janzen joined the PAX program of the Mennonite Central Committee that took him to Africa for two years of service in lieu of joining the U.S. military. During this time, Janzen worked on projects involving education, and helped in the construction of a hospital in the late colonial setting of the South Savannah of Belgian Congo. It was during this time that Janzen became interested in learning more about Africa. Returning home, Janzen pursued a graduate degree in anthropology. He graduated from Bethel College in 1961 with a bachelor's degree in Social Science and Philosophy, and was accepted to the University of Chicago as a graduate student in anthropology.

After a first year taking the core courses in anthropology at Chicago, Janzen benefited from a French Government grant to attend the University of Paris (Sorbonne), from which he received a certificate of African Studies in 1963.  Fearing that Central Africa would be closed to field research because of political unrest, Janzen shifted his focus to North Africa and the Middle East, and to a course program in Arabic and Islamic Culture with Mushin Madhi of the Oriental Institute at the University of Chicago. Janzen received an M.A. in Anthropology from the University of Chicago in May 1964, and began his PhD at the University of Chicago soon after. John married Kauenhoven, the same year.

Between 1964 and 1966, John traveled to the lower Congo region, where he examined the social and political organization, economic development, religion, health, and patterns of health care seeking among the Kongo peoples. Here, Janzen’s research took on a historical perspective, as he used the pre-colonial, colonial, and post-colonial mercantile trade of the 16th to late 19th centuries to illustrate how the trade contributed to shaping Kongo perceptions of health, suffering, and healing from the 17th to the early 20th centuries. Janzen returned home in 1966 to complete his dissertation, titled "Elemental Categories, Symbols, and Ideas of Association in Kongo-Manianga Society." He received his PhD from the University of Chicago in June 1967.

Professional life 

Janzen returned to Newton, Kansas and began teaching as an assistant professor at Bethel College from 1967 to 1968. In 1969 he received the Social Science Research Council Post-Doctoral Fellowship and returned to the lower Congo/Zaire region to complete a study on Kongo therapeutics. He began teaching as an assistant professor at McGill University in Montreal in late 1969. It was here that Janzen was first exposed to semiotics. He looked for ways to connect materiality with ideas and symbols in a continuum, and looked into the work of Victor Turner, who resolved the relation between materiality, consciousness, and ideas, without fixating on any one particular aspect. Janzen also began reading Roland Barthes' books on semiotics and grew highly interested in the field.

In summer 1970, Janzen spent a month in Sweden working on Lower Congo archival materials. He returned to his teaching position at McGill and remained there until 1972, when he received an offer as associate professor in socio-cultural anthropology and African studies from the University of Kansas. In 1974, Janzen published with Wyatt MacGaffey An Anthology of Kongo Religion: Primary Texts from Lower Zaire (KU Publications in Anthropology 1974).

During his time at the University of Kansas, Janzen published The Quest for Therapy in Lower Zaire (California, 1978), reissued in paperback as The Quest for Therapy: Medical Pluralism in Lower Zaire (1982) and in French translation as La quête de la thérapie au Bas-Zaïre (Karthala, 1995). This was based on Janzen’s Social Science Research Council Post-Doctoral Fellowship, as well as a two-year seminar taught at McGill. The book, which examined the foundations of Equatorial African approaches to sickness and healing from African and Western-derived biomedical therapies, received the Wellcome Medal and Award from the Royal Anthropological Institute of Great Britain and Ireland for anthropological research pertaining to medical issues. Eventually the previous series editor, Professor Charles Leslie of the University of California Press, asked him to become editor of the Comparative Studies of Health Systems and Medical Care journal, a position he accepted.

While still teaching at the University of Kansas, Janzen received the Alexander von Humboldt Fellowship for his study on the Western Equatorial African historic Lemba cult traces in Western European museums. Janzen’s research of the Lemba, which he described as a cult for elite men and women emphasizing alliance building through marriage, trade, and healing, led to the publication of his book Lemba (1650–1930): A Drum of Affliction in Africa and the new World (1982). In this book, Janzen identifies the sickness of the Lemba as resulting from subordinate's envy of the mercantile elite’s wealth. The drum of affliction, a translation of the proto and pan-Bantu word ngoma, typically includes a mode of affliction, a network of those commonly afflicted, visitation on them by an ancestor or spirit who has experienced the same affliction, and ritual event that brings together healers, the commonly afflicted, and their families in rhythmic, song-dance, therapeutic activity. The drum of affliction paradigm had been explored earlier by Victor Turner's work in the Southern Savannah.

Janzen's work on the Ngoma paradigm led to further exploration of the phenomenon by expanding his research into Central and Southern Africa. He traveled to much of the Eastern and Western Bantu areas of Africa. His position as a lecturer at the University of Cape Town facilitated his access to information and contacts. He published Ngoma: Discourses of Healing in Central and Southern Africa in 1992. Another aspect of Janzen’s work during this time was the tracing of Kongo culture to the New World.

Also dedicated to his research on the Mennonites, Janzen remained actively involved in Mennonite affairs. In 1991, Janzen and his wife, Reinhild, co-authored a book, which was the catalogue of a special exhibit at the museum, titled Mennonite Furniture: A Migrant Tradition 1766-1910. Janzen became heavily involved in Mennonite history during a 1989 sabbatical, when he and his wife traced the regions from the Netherlands to the Baltic Seacoast.

Janzen’s work on African healing continued to expand when in 1994–1995, he was asked to travel to the post-genocide Great Lakes Region of Rwanda, Burundi, and eastern Zaire/Congo. This led to another book; Do I Still have a Life? Voices from the Aftermath of War in Rwanda and Burundi (2001), a comparison of the actions of ordinary people and leaders in several communes in Rwanda and Burundi leading up to, and following, the war and genocide.

His work at the University of Kansas soon developed into a concentration on African Medical Anthropology, involving work with war, trauma, healing, semiotics, socio-cultural anthropology, and medical anthropology. During this time, Janzen published The Social Fabric of Health: An Introduction to Medical Anthropology (2002).

In 2013 Janzen undertook a field research project on postcolonial health in the Lower Congo.  With the support of the IIE-Fulbright Program he and Reinhild Kauenhoven Janzen spent four months in the Congo riverside town of Luozi to conduct this research. His research was facilitated by the Free University of Luozi, with special help from the university rector, Dr. Kimpianga Mahaniah.  An analysis of this research work was enhanced with a residency in 2014 at the University of Halle-Wittenberg, Germany, and the Max Planck Institute for Social Anthropology in Halle.  Research findings and interpretations will be published in the monograph "Health in a Fragile State: Science, Sorcery, and Spirit in the Lower Congo" (Madison, WI: University of Wisconsin Press, 2019).

Selected awards and grants 
1969 Social Science Research Council Post-Doctoral Fellowship, Kongo therapeutics;
1978 Wellcome Medal and Award, Royal Anthropological Institute of Great Britain and Ireland, for anthropological research and publication pertaining to medical issues—Quest for Therapy;
1979 Alexander von Humboldt Fellowship, Western Equatorial African historic Lemba cult, traces in Western European museums;
1980 National Science Foundation, for Research Planning International Conference on "Causality and Classification in African Medicine," Emmanuel College, Cambridge, England;
1982-3	Fulbright Senior Research Fellowship, Zaire, Swaziland, Tanzania, ngoma healing;
1985-2006 Numerous PhD student fellowships from Fulbright, NIH, NSF, and SSRC to sponsor dissertation research on health and healing in Africa and elsewhere.
2000-3	Department of Education Title VI National Resource Center grant for African Studies Center University of Kansas, $618,000;
2003 Balfour Jeffreys Social Sciences & Humanities Research Achievement Award, U. of Kansas.
2004 Visiting Lecturer: Harvard University & Medizinische Universitaet Vienna
2004 Kansas Humanities Council: New African Immigrants project.
2006-10 U.S. Dept. of Education NRC Grant for Kansas African Studies Center.
2006-10 U.S. Dept. of Education Foreign Language & Area Study.
2006  Longview Foundation, for KASC; "teaching Africa and the Middle-East in the Great Plains;" curricular modules for secondary schools & on-line Con't Ed. graduate course.
2012 Byron Alexander Award for Excellence in Graduate Advising, University of Kansas College of Liberal Arts & Sciences.
2013 International Institute of Education, Fulbright Foundation, for research in Lower Congo
2014 Research Fellowship, University of Wittenberg/Halle & Max Planck Institute for Social Anthropology.

Publications 
Books
1974 Anthology of Kongo Religion: Primary Texts from Lower Zaire. KU Publ. in Anthropology # 5, Lawrence. 163 pp. (with Wyatt MacGaffey)
1978 The Quest for Therapy in Lower Zaire. Berkeley & London. University of California Press, 267 pp. (with collab. Wm. Arkinstall) Paperback edition, 1982.
1979 The Social History of Disease and Medicine in Africa. Special Issue: Social Science and Medicine 13B, 268 pp., (with Steven Feierman)
1980 The Development of Health. Akron, Pa., Mennonite Central Committee (Development Monograph 8), March., 32 pp.
1981 Causality and Classification in African Medicine and Health. Special Issue: Social Science and Medicine, 15B,3, 268 pp. (with Gwyn Prins)
1982 Lemba (1650–1930): A Drum of Affliction in Africa and the new World. New York, Garland Publ., 383 pp.
1991 Mennonite Furniture: A Migrant Tradition 1766–1910. Intercourse, PA: Good Books.
1992 The Social Basis of Health and Healing in Africa, ed. with Steve Feierman, University of California Press.
1992 Ngoma: Discourses of Healing in Central and Southern Africa. University of California Press.
1995 Quête de la Guérison dans le Bas-Zaïre. Paris: Karthala.
1999 The Architecture of Anabaptist-Mennonite Spaces and Places of Meeting and Worship. Proceedings of an International Conference October 16–18, 1997, Harleysville PA. Special Issue of Mennonite Quarterly Review, April. (Editor with David Rempel-Smucker).
2000 Do I still have a life? Voices from the aftermath of war in Rwanda and Burundi, 1994-1995. KU Monographs in Anthropology # 20. with Reinhild Janzen.
2001 The Social Fabric of Health: An Introduction to Medical Anthropology. New York: McGraw-Hill
2008 "Global Medical Anthropology in the U.S. Heartland." Editor, Special issue, Viennese Ethnomedicine Newsletter, Feb. & June (2&3).
2009 "A Carved Loango Tlusk: Local Images and Global Connections." KU Monographs in Anthropology 24.
2014 "Medical Anthropology in Global Africa." Eds. Kathryn Rhine, J.M.Janzen, Glenn Adams, Heather Aldersey. KU Publications in Anthropology 26.
 2019 "Health in a Fragile State: Science, Sorcery, and Spirit in the Lower Congo." Madison: University of Wisconsin Press.

Selected articles 
1969a "Vers une phénomenologie de la guérison en Afrique centrale" Études congolaises XII:2, 97-115.
1969b "The Politics of Apoliticality: Form and Process in a Lower Congo Regional Council" Cahiers d'Études africaines IX,4, 570-99.
1969c "The Cooperative in Lower Congo Economic Development", in The Anthropology of Development in Sub-Saharan Africa, ed. David Brokensha & Marion Pearsall, Soc. Appl. Anthro. Monogr. 10, 70-76.
1970 "The Etiquette of Charity", The Mennonite, 27,456-9; 28,472-5
1971 "Kongo Religious Renewal: Iconoclastic and Iconorthostic", Canadian J. of African Studies, V, 135-43.
1972a "Laman's Kongo Ethnography: Observations on Sources, Methods, and Theories", Africa, 422, 316-28.
1972b "The Confrontation of Church and State in Zaire: Alternative Structures and the Problem of Legitimation" In L'Afrique Occidentale: Développement et Société, Montreal, U. of M. Centre Int. de Criminologie comparée, 181-206.
1974 "N'kisi Figures of the Bakongo" and "Rejoinder on N'kisi" African Arts, 7,3, 87-90; 8,1, 82 (with Wyatt MacGaffey).
1975a "The Dynamics of Therapy in Lower Zaire", in Psychological Anthropology, ed. T.R. Williams, The Hague, Mouton, 441-63.
1975b "Pluralistic Legitimation of Therapy Systems in Zaire", Rural Africana, 26, 105-22; (republished in African Therapeutic Systems, Waltham, Crossroads Press, 1978, ed. A.Ademuwagun, et al.)
1975c "The Pende Masks in Kauffman Museum", African Arts, VIII,4,44-47 (with Reinhild Janzen).
1977 "The Tradition of Renewal in Kongo Religion", in African Religions: A Symposium, pp. 69–114, Newell Booth, ed., New York, London, Lagos: Nok Publications.
1978 "The Comparative Study of Medical Systems as Changing Social Systems", Social Science & Medicine, 12, 2B, 121-9.
1979a "Deep Thought: Structure and Intention in Kongo Prophetism, 1910-21", Social Research, 106-139.
1979b "Ideologies and Institutions in the Precolonial History of Equatorial African Therapeutic Systems", Soc.Sci.Med., 13B
1981 "The Need for a Taxonomy of Health in the Study of African Therapeutics", Soc.Sci.Med. 15B,3,
1982a "Lubanzi: The History of a Kongo Disease", in African Health and Healing, ed. S. Yoder, Los Angeles: Crossroads Press, pp. 107–119.
1982b "Medicalization in Comparative Perspective" pp. 3–18 and "Drums Anonymous: Towards an Understanding of Structures of Therapeutic Maintenance", pp. 154–66,In The Use and Abuse of Medicine, eds. Marten de Vries, R.L. Berg & Mack Lipkin, Jr., New York: Praeger.
1982c "Resource Allocation and Symbol Formation in Great Plains Festivals", Rituals, Mind and Symbol, ed. Allan Hanson, University of Kansas Publ. in Anthropology 14, 50-65.
1983 "Towards a Historical Perspective on African Medicine and Health", in Ethnomedicine and Medical History, ed. J. Sterly & F. Lichtenthaeler, Berlin: Verlag Mensch u. Leben.
1985a "Consequences of Literacy in African Religion" in The Social Science of African Religion: Theoretical & Methodological Explorations, eds., Wim van Binsbergen & Matthew Schoffeleers, London: Routledge & Kegan Paul (Afrika-Studiecentrum, Leiden), pp. 225–252.
1985b "Changing Concepts of African Therapeutics: An Historical Perspective" in African Healing Strategies, eds. B. du Toit & I.H. Abdalla. Owerri, New York, Trado-Medic Books, 61-81.
1986 "Ippocrati del deserto, Galeni della savana," Kos: Revista di cultura e storia delle scienze mediche, III (Feb/Mar), 20, pp. 39–61.
1987a "Old Age Security and the Family Life Course: A Case Study of Nineteenth Century Mennonite Immigrants to Kansas" Journal of Aging Studies, Vol.I:1, pp. 33–49 (with Jill Quadagno).
1987b "Therapy Management: Concept, Reality, Process" Medical Anthropology Quarterly I:1(ns), pp. 68–84.
1987c "Bethel's Museum: A Centennial History" Mennonite Life.Vol. 42,1, pp. 31–38.
1987d "African Cults of Affliction" Vol. I, pp. 55–59 & "Kongo Religion" Vol. 8, pp. 362–5 In The Encyclopedia of Religion, ed. M. Eliade, et al. New York, The Free Press.
1988a "Health, Religion and Medicine in Central and Southern African Traditions", pp. 225–254, Caring and Curing: Health and Medicine in the World's Religious Traditions, ed. L. Sullivan. New York: MacMillan.
1988b Commentary on "A Methodology for Cross-cultural Ethnomedical Research," Current Anthropology 29,5, 695.
1990a "The Art of Lemba in Lower Zaire," In Art and Initiation in Zaire, special issue of Iowa Papers in Africa Art, ed. Christopher Roy (with Reinhild Janzen).
1990b "Strategies of Health-Seeking and Structures of Social Support in Central and Southern Africa. In What we know about Health Transition, eds. John Caldwell, S. Findley, P.Caldwell, lD. Broers-Freeman and W. Cosford. Canberra: Health Transition Centre (Health Trans. Ser. 2).
1990c "Burial Customs" (pp. 110–111) and "Funerals"(p. 320) in Mennonite Encyclopedia V.
1991 "Doing Ngoma: A Dominant Trope in African Religion and Healing." J. of Religion in Africa, XXI,4, 290-308.
1992 "Drums of Affliction: Real Phenomenon or Scholarly Chimera?" 161-181. In Religion in Africa: Experience and Expression. Eds. T. Blakeley, W. van Beek& D.Thompson. London: J. Curry; Portsmouth: Heinemann.
1994 "The History and Significance of a Mennonite Prayerhouse: The 1880 Bethel Adobe Sanctuary of Inman, Kansas." Mennonite Life.49,3, 4-12.
1995 "Self-Presentation and Common Cultural Structures in Ngoma Rituals of Southern Africa." Journal of Religion in Africa. XXV, 2, 141-162.
1997 "Sub-Saharan African Healing." Lincolnwood, IL: Ancient Healing. Publications International. Pp. 322–337.
1998 "The Comparative Study of Medical Systems as Changing Social Systems," In Sjaak van der Geest & A. Rienks, eds., The Culture of Health and illness: Readings in Medical Anthropology, Amsterdam Med. Anthro. Unit. (revised republication of 1978 version).
1999a "Anabaptist/Mennonite Spaces and Places of Worship" Introduction to special issue of Mennonite Quarterly Review, Vol. 73, April, 151-165.
1999b "Form and Meaning in Central Kansas Mennonite Buildings for Worship," special issue of Mennonite Quarterly Review, Vol. 73, April, 325-354.
1999c "Ayiwewe": Children of Rwanda draw their memories of war." Canadian J. of African Studies, Vol. 33, special issue, ed. Bogumil Jewsiewicki.  (with Reinhild Janzen)
1999d "Text and Context in the Anthropology of War Trauma: The African Great Lakes Region, 1993-1995." Suomen Antropologi: J. of the Finnish Anthropological Society, 4, 24, 37 -57..
2000a "Theories of Music in African ‘Ngoma’ Healing." pp. 46-66 In Musical Healing in Cultural Context. Ed. Penelope Gouk. London: Ashgate Publishing, Ltd.
2000b "Historical Consciousness and a 'Prise de Conscience' in Genocidal Rwanda." Journal of African Cultural Studies. Special Issue, Eds. JDY Peel & John Lonsdale. 13, 1: 153-168.
2000c "Afterword" to The Quest for Fruition: Studies of the Political and the Therapeutical in Ngoma, eds. Rijk van Dijk, Ria Reis, & Marja Spierenburg. Oxford: James Currey Publishers.
2001 "Mind/body, subject/object: Recent trends in medical anthropology." Reviews in Anthropology. Vol. 30, pp. 357–374.
2003a "Continuity, Change, and Challenge in African Medicine," In Medicine across Cultures: The History of Non-Western Medicine, ed. Helain Selin. Dordrecht: Kluwer Academic Publishers. with Edward C. Green. (on-line revised re-edition with Kluwer-Springer, 2006).
2003b "Illusions of Home: The Story of Return of a Rwandan Refugee." In Lynellyn Long & Ellen Oxfeld, eds. Coming Home? Refugees who Return. University of Pennsylvania Press.
2004 "Affliction: African Cults of Affliction" & "Kongo Religion" Encyclopedia of Religion. MacMillan Reference, USA. 2nd edition. Revised essays and bibliographies.
2005a "Religious Healing among War Traumatized African Immigrants to the United States." In Religion and Healing in America. Pp. 159-172. Eds. Linda Barnes & Susan Sered. Oxford University Press. With Adrien Ngudiankama and Melissa Filippi-Franz.
2005b "The Lemba Trading Association as seen in the Rymar Ivory." African Carved Ivory: A Mini-Conference on Local Images & Global Connections of a 19th Century Loango Tusk. Kansas African Studies Center, University of Kansas. April 13. Spencer Museum of Art, University of Kansas.
2006a "Tsistsistas in Kauffman Museum: On the Making and Meaning of the Cheyenne Segment in the Permanent Exhibition 'Of Land and People'." Mennonite Life, June, vol. 61, no. 2.
2006b	Business & Islam: Proceedings of a Workshop, April 7–8, University of Kansas. Sponsored by the Kansas African Studies Center, Center for International Business Education & Research, the Department of Economics, and Mohamed El-Hodiri. With Ousmane Seck & Zaier Aouani.
2006c "Medicine in Africa." Encyclopedia of the History of Science, Technology, and Medicine in Non-Western Cultures. Springer Online Publications. With Edward Green.
2007 "Healing and Health Care: African Theories and therapies." New Encyclopedia of Africa. Gale.
2009 "The Social Reproduction of Health." Essays in Medical Anthropology / Festschrift—30 Years of Austrian Ethnomedical Society. Eds. Ruth Kutalek & Armin Prinz. Muenster, Berlin, Hamburg, London, Wien, Zurich: LIT-Verlag. Pp. 91-109.
2010 "Science and Religion in Sub-Saharan African Medicine," Science and Religion Around the World: Historical Perspectives, Eds. Ron Numbers & John Brooks. Oxford University Press.  (with Steven Feierman)
2011 "Contested Measures of Humanity in African Suffering and Healing." Journal of Religion and Society. Supplement Series nO. 7 PP. 5-24 (Catalogue of Photographs, 24-74).
2012a "Teaching the Kongo-Transatlantic." Africa Diaspora Archaeology Newsletter, Spring, 1-18.                                 *2012b. "Afri-Global Medicine: New Perspectives on Epidemics, Drugs, Wars, Migrations and Healing Rituals," Medicine, Mobility, and Power in Global Africa: Transnational Health and Healing. Ed. Hansjörg Dilger, Abdoulaye Kane and Stacey Langwick. Indiana University Press.
2012c "Identity, Voice, Community: New African Immigrants to Kansas."In Causes and Consequences of Human Migration. Cambridge: Cambridge University Press. Eds. Michael Crawford & Ben Campbell. 186-200.
2013a "Minkisi at the Articulations of Individual and Societal Stress Points." Fragments of the Invisible: The Rene and Odette Delenne Collection of Congo Sculpture. Cleveland Museum of Art. Pp. 46-53.
2013b "Renewal and Reinterpretation in Kongo Religion." Kongo Across the Waters. Gainesville: Harn Museum of Art; Tervuren: Central Africa Museum. Pp. 132-142.
2013c "Kongo Atlantic Diaspora." Oxford Bibliographies Online. 
2014a "Healing--Africa." Princeton Companion to Atlantic History, ed. Joseph C. Miller. Princeton: Princeton University Press.
2014b "Imagining the Whole: Local Medicine and Global Health. Medical Anthropology in lGlobal Africa. Pp. 19-25. KU Publications in Anthropology 26.
2015a "Science and Spirit in Postcolonial North Kongo Health and Healing." African Studies Quarterly, Vol. 15, Issue 3, pp., 47-63.
2015b "Divergent Legitimations of Post-State Health Institutions in Western Equatorial Africa. Working Paper Series 14, SPP 1448, Adaptation & Creativity in Africa. University of Healle-Wittenberg.
2015c "Opportunities and Challenges of 'War Ethnography': Anthropological Engagement in the African Great Lakes Region." Max Planck Institute for Social Anthropology. Working Papers # 163. Halle/Saale, Germany.
2016a "Ethnography in the Service of Understanding Human Conflict." Psychosociological Issues in Human Resource Management. 4 (2), pp. 75-103.
2016b "The Anthropology of Violence in Central and Southern Africa. Journal of Public Health Policy. Sept., Vol. 37, Supplement 1, pp. 122-132. Special Issue, ed., Bandy Lee. 
2017a "Science in the Moral Space of Health and Healing Paradigms in Western Equatorial Africa. In African Medical Pluralism, eds. William Olsen & Carolyn Sargent. Bloomington: Indiana University Press.
2017b "African Religion and Healing in the Atlantic diaspora." Oxford Research Encyclopedia of African History.

References 

1937 births
Living people
People from Newton, Kansas
American Mennonites
American anthropologists
Cultural anthropologists
Health in Africa
University of Kansas faculty
University of Paris alumni
University of Chicago alumni
Mennonite writers